Real Things may refer to:

 "Real Things" (song), a 2003 song by Javine
 Real Things (2 Unlimited album), 1994
 Real Things (Joe Nichols album), 2007 (or the title song)

See also
 The Real Thing (disambiguation)